1805 in sports describes the year's events in world sport.

Boxing
Events
 Hen Pearce wins the English championship after defeating Jem Belcher in 18 rounds at Doncaster.
 8 October — future English champion Tom Cribb narrowly defeats Afro-American Bill Richmond, who was born into slavery.

Cricket
Events
 Lord Frederick Beauclerk is the first batsman known to have scored two first-class centuries in the same season
England
 Most runs – Lord Frederick Beauclerk 468 (HS 129*)
 Most wickets – William Lambert 20

Horse racing
England
 The Derby – Cardinal Beaufort
 The Oaks – Meteora
 St Leger Stakes – Staveley

References

 
1805